Lucas Martínez Callegari (born 11 September 1997) is a Chilean footballer who currently plays for Venezuelan Primera División club Deportivo Lara as a forward.

Career
A product of Universidad Católica youth system, he took part of the Deportes La Serena squad in 2016.

In 2017, he joined Coquimbo Unido, where he made his professional debut and won the 2018 Primera B. After stints with Colchagua and Deportes Recoleta, with whom he won the 2021 Segunda División Profesional, he moved to Venezuela and joined Deportivo Lara in the top level.

Personal life
Due to his Italian heritage, Martínez holds Italian citizenship.

Honours
Coquimbo Unido
 Primera B: 2018

Deportes Recoleta
 Segunda División Profesional:

References

External links
 
 

Living people
1997 births
Chilean people of Italian descent
People from La Serena
Chilean footballers
Chilean expatriate footballers
Deportes La Serena footballers
Coquimbo Unido footballers
Deportes Colchagua footballers
Deportes Recoleta footballers
Asociación Civil Deportivo Lara players
Primera B de Chile players
Chilean Primera División players
Segunda División Profesional de Chile players
Venezuelan Primera División players
Chilean expatriate sportspeople in Venezuela
Expatriate footballers in Venezuela
Association football forwards
Naturalised citizens of Italy